Monocelididae is family of marine turbellarian flatworms in the order Proseriata, sub order Lithophora.

Genera 
Archiloinae Faubel & Rohde, 1998
Archilina Ax, 1959
Archiloa de Beauchamp, 1910
Archilopsis Meixner, 1938
Inaloa Martens & Curini-Galletti, 1994
Mesoda Marcus, 1949
Monocelopsis Ax, 1951
Tajikina Martens & Curini-Galletti, 1994
Cannoninae Faubel & Rohde, 1998
Acanthopseudomonocelis Curini-Galletti & Cannon, 1995
Cannona Faubel & Rohde, 1998
Pseudomonocelis Meixner, 1943
Globuliphorinae Westblad, 1952
Globuliphora Westblad, 1952
Minoninae Karling, 1978
Duplominona Karling, 1966
Duploperaclistus Martens, 1983
Ectocotyla Hyman, 1944
Minona Marcus, 1946
Peraclistus Steinböck, 1932
Preminona Karling, 1966
Pseudominona Karling, 1978
Monocelidinae Midelburg, 1908
Boreocelis Westblad, 1952
Digenobothrium Palombi, 1926
Heteromonocelis Miller & Faubel, 2003
Monocelis Ehrenberg, 1831
Myrmeciplana Graff, 1911
Necia Marcus, 1950
Paramonotus Meixner, 1938
Sabazius Marcus, 1954
Promonotinae Marcus, 1949
Promonotus Beklemischev, 1927

References 

Turbellaria